Ilan Qarah-ye Olya (also Romanized as Īlān Qarah-ye ‘Olyā; also known as Tāzeh Kand-e Īlān Qarah and Īlānqarah-ye Bālā) is a village in Chaybasar-e Jonubi Rural District, in the Central District of Maku County, West Azerbaijan Province, Iran. At the 2006 census, its population was 55, in 11 families.

References 

Populated places in Maku County